Shwenabay (also known as Naga Medaw is one of the 37 nats in the Burmese pantheon of nats. According to belief, she was a beautiful woman of Mindon Village who married a Naga. Later, her husband deserted her and she died of a broken heart. Another story maintains that she was actually the wife of Maung Tint De. She is portrayed standing, wearing Naga headdress, her right hand on her chest and her left hand by her side.

References

04
Burmese goddesses
Nāgas